Tootie Smith (born March 3, 1957) is an American politician and hazelnut farmer from the state of Oregon. A Republican, she served in the state legislature from 2001 until 2005, and on the Clackamas County Board of Commissioners from 2013 until 2017.

In 2019, she announced her candidacy for Clackamas County Chair. She won the election with 64,502 votes (53.22%).

Biography
Smith was born in 1957 in Oregon City. She attended Mount Hood Community College and graduated from Concordia University.

Smith was elected to the Oregon House of Representatives in 2000, and reelected in 2002. In 2012, she was elected to the Clackamas County Board of Commissioners. Smith unsuccessfully ran for the United States House of Representatives in 2014, but lost to incumbent Democrat Kurt Schrader, receiving 39% of the vote. Smith ran for reelection to the county commission in 2016, but lost to Ken Humberston. Smith ran for Clackamas County Chair in 2020 and won. Her term began in January 2021.

In a comment generating controversy, Smith in 2020 said that following her state's COVID restrictions was like being a "second-rate slave".

Personal life
Smith and her husband, Nate, have  one child.

References

External links
 

1957 births
Living people
Republican Party members of the Oregon House of Representatives
County commissioners in Oregon
Women state legislators in Oregon
21st-century American women politicians
21st-century American politicians
Politicians from Oregon City, Oregon
Concordia University (Oregon) alumni
Mt. Hood Community College alumni